Eberhard Anheuser (27 September 1806–May 1880) was a German-American soap and candle maker, and the father-in-law of Adolphus Busch, the founder of the Anheuser-Busch Company.

Anheuser grew up in Kreuznach, where his parents operated a vineyard that had been in the family since 1627. Two of his brothers and he moved to North America in 1842. He was a major creditor of the Bavarian Brewery Company, a struggling brewery founded in 1853. When the company encountered financial difficulty in 1860, he purchased the minor creditors' interests and took over the company.

Eberhard Anheuser became president and CEO and changed the company name to the Eberhard Anheuser and Company. His daughter Lilly married Adolphus Busch, a brewery supply salesman, in a double wedding with Anna Anheuser (Lilly's older sister) and Ulrich Busch (Adolphus' brother) in 1861. Despite the outbreak of the Civil War, the brewery remained competitive, partially because lager was not banned by the Union Army, while hard liquors were.

As Anheuser became older, Adolphus Busch took up more of the company's duties, and the company was renamed Anheuser-Busch in 1879.

Anheuser died in 1880 and was buried in Bellefontaine Cemetery in St. Louis near Adolphus Busch.

See also
Anheuser family
 Jacob Best
 Valentin Blatz
 Adolphus Busch
 Adolph Coors
 Gottlieb Heileman
 Frederick Miller
 Frederick Pabst
 Joseph Schlitz
 August Uihlein

References

External links

1806 births
1880 deaths
Eberhard
German emigrants to the United States
People from Bad Kreuznach
People from the Rhine Province
American brewers
Burials at Bellefontaine Cemetery